NGC 1374 is a low-luminosity elliptical galaxy in the southern constellation Fornax. It was discovered by John Herschel on November 29, 1837.

Location 
It is at a distance of 59 million light years. The galaxy may form a pair with another nearby galaxy, NGC 1375, but this is uncertain based on the estimated distance of NGC 1375. It is a member of the Fornax Cluster, a cluster of 200 galaxies, and it is positioned near the center of the cluster and central galaxy NGC 1399, while the closest galaxy after NGC 1375, outside the pair, is NGC 1373. NGC 1374's size on the night sky is 2.7' x 2.4′ which, with the galaxy's distance, gives a diameter of 50,000 light-years.

Classification 

NGC 1374 is an early-type galaxy with a Hubble classification of E1, indicating a flattening of 10%, but also it shows a subtle differentiation of light about halfway out of radius, which is indicating transition to S0 classification. It has a bright core surrounded by a soft hazy halo.

Despite their name, early-type galaxies are much older than spiral galaxies, and mostly comprise old, red-colored stars. Very little star formation occurs in these galaxies; the lack of star formation in elliptical galaxies appears to start at the center and then slowly propagates outward.

Globular clusters 
NGC 1374 is rich with globular clusters, with an estimated number of cluster of 406 ± 81. There are blue and red globular clusters, although red globulars are more populous than blue ones. A similar trend is present in NGC 1379 and NGC 1387. These globular clusters, like globulars in NGC 1379 and NGC 1387, did not show any evidences of multiple populations.

References

External links 
 

Fornax Cluster
Elliptical galaxies
1374
Fornax (constellation)
013267